Éliane Dudal (6 May 1926 – 6 January 2022) was a French athlete. She competed in the women's long jump at the 1952 Summer Olympics.

References

External links 
 
 

1926 births
2022 deaths
Athletes (track and field) at the 1952 Summer Olympics
French female long jumpers
Olympic athletes of France
People from Argenteuil